Stefano Cincotta Giordano (born 28 February 1991) is a Guatemalan former professional footballer who played as a left-back.

Club career
In September 2018, after featuring sparingly, Cincotta left fourth-tier side SV Elversberg to return to his country of birth Guatemala, joining C.D. Guastatoya. Ahead of the following 2019–20 season, Cincotta joined Comunicaciones on a one-year contract. In January 2020, Cincotta moved to Cobán Imperial. However, his contract was terminated by mutual agreement on 13 March 2020 because his parents, who was living in Germany, were concerned due to the COVID-19 pandemic. A few weeks later, Cincotta revealed that he wanted to return to Europa because he had suffered from a lot of injuries since his return to Guatemala. This was also one of the reasons why he terminated his contract with Cobán Imperial.

Cincotta announced his retirement from playing in January 2021.

International career
Cincotta's parents met in Germany. His father is Italian, while his mother (Alma Giordano) is a Guatemalan with a partial Italian descent. They went to Guatemala, where Cincotta was born. They returned to Germany shortly after, where he grew up. As a result, Cincotta was eligible to play for the national teams of Guatemala, Italy and Germany. After representing Germany at youth level, Cincotta  expressed his desire to play for Guatemala at senior level.

International goals
Scores and results list Guatemala's goal tally first, score column indicates score after each Cincotta goal.

Honours
Guastatoya
Liga Nacional de Guatemala: Apertura 2018

References

External links
 
 
 

1991 births
Living people
Sportspeople from Guatemala City
Guatemalan people of Italian descent
Association football defenders
Guatemalan footballers
Guatemala international footballers
Naturalized citizens of Germany
German footballers
Germany youth international footballers
Guatemalan expatriate footballers
German expatriate footballers
Kickers Offenbach players
FC Lugano players
SV Wacker Burghausen players
Chemnitzer FC players
SV Elversberg players
C.D. Guastatoya players
Comunicaciones F.C. players
Cobán Imperial players
3. Liga players
Regionalliga players
Swiss Challenge League players
2015 CONCACAF Gold Cup players
Expatriate footballers in Switzerland
German expatriate sportspeople in Switzerland
Guatemalan expatriate sportspeople in Switzerland